Irish is a surname.

Notable people bearing this name include:

 Bill Irish (1932–1992), English lawn and indoor bowler
 Carolyn Tanner Irish (born 1940), Episcopal Bishop
 Ernest G. Irish (1894–1955), Canadian politician
 Frank Irish (1918–1997), English cricketer who played for Somerset and Devon
 Frederick M. Irish (1870–1941), Arizona football coach 1896–1906
 George Irish, Montserratian academic, professor of Caribbean studies
 Jack Irish, protagonist in a series of novels by Peter Temple
 Jane Irish (born 1955), American artist, painter, and ceramicist
 Jim Irish (born 1941), Irish hurler
 John P. Irish (1843-1923), American politician, Iowa Democrat
 Joseph E. Irish (1833–1899), American politician, member of the Wisconsin State Senate
 Lesroy Irish (born 1972), Montserratian cricketer
 Mark Irish (born 1981), English rugby player
 Natalie Irish (born 1982), American visual artist
 Ned Irish (1905–1982), American basketball promoter
 O. H. Irish (Orsamus Hylas Irish; 1830–1883), Chief of the Bureau of Engraving and Printing (1878–1883)
 Ronald Irish (born 1913), Australian executive

See also
 Irish (disambiguation)
 Irish name

English-language surnames
English toponymic surnames
Ethnonymic surnames